The Catacombs was a gay and lesbian S/M leather fisting club in the South of Market area of San Francisco, which operated from 1975 to 1981, and reopened at another location from 1982 to 1984. It was the most famous fisting club in the world. The founder and owner was Steve McEachern. The location was semi-secret and admission was by referral only. It was originally a gay men's club, and Cynthia Slater persuaded the management to open up to lesbians.  Among the patrons was Patrick Califia, known then as Pat Califia. The Catacombs has been exhaustively described by sexual anthropologist Gayle Rubin, who calls it "exemplary" in its attempts to deal with the AIDS crisis which would eventually lead to its closure. Patrick Moore devotes a chapter to it in his Beyond Shame: Reclaiming the Abandoned History of Radical Gay Sexuality. Sex educator Carol Queen called it "the place to be seen and to play at during the 1980s."

The San Francisco South of Market Leather History Alley consists of four works of art along Ringold Alley honoring leather culture; it opened in 2017. One of the works of art is metal bootprints along the curb which honor 28 people, including Catacombs founder and owner Steve McEachern, who were an important part of the leather communities of San Francisco.

References

Gay bathhouses in California
LGBT BDSM
LGBT in California
Leather subculture
Sexuality in San Francisco
South of Market, San Francisco